The Order of the Crown of Italy ( or OCI) was founded as a national order in 1868 by King Vittorio Emanuele II, to commemorate the unification of Italy in 1861. It was awarded in five degrees for civilian and military merit. Today the Order of the Crown has been replaced by the Order of Merit of Savoy and is still conferred on new knights by the current head of the house of Vittorio Emanuele, Prince of Naples.

The order has been suppressed by law since the foundation of the Republic in 1946. However, Umberto II did not abdicate his position as fons honorum and it remained under his Grand Mastership as a dynastic order. While the continued use of those decorations conferred prior to 1951 is permitted in Italy, the crowns on the ribbons issued before 1946 must be substituted for as many five pointed stars on military uniforms.

Grades 
The various degrees of the order, with corresponding ribbons, were as follows:

Insignia

Members 
Members of the order have included:

Isaac Artom (1829–1900), Italian writer diplomat, and politician
Harry Woodburn Blaylock (1878–1928),  Canadian lawyer and businessman
Aaron Bradshaw Jr. (1894–1976), United States Army; World War II, commanded Anti-Aircraft troops of U.S. Fifth Army
John Buchan (1875–1940), Scottish novelist and diplomat
Vice Admiral Felice Napoleone Canevaro (1838–1926),  Italian admiral and diplomat
Major-general (United Kingdom) Walter Clutterbuck (1894–1987), British Army; World War II
Adolf von Deines (1845–1911), Prussian diplomat and General of the Cavalry
Arthur Conan Doyle (1859–1930),  Scottish statesman and Sherlock Holmes author
Cmdr Sir Thomas Fisher RN, English Naval Officer, Managing Director of Canadian Pacific Steamship Company
James Whitelaw Hamilton (1860–1932),  Scottish artist, member of the Royal Scottish Academy
William Ernest Powell Giles (1835–1897),  Australian explorer, gambler, not always strictly sober.
Thomas Hanbury (1832–1907),  English philanthropist and creator of the Giardini Botanici Hanbury
Major General James Murray Robert Harrison DSO, CB (1880–1957), Royal Artillery, British Army in recognition of services on Italian-Austrian frontier WW1
Vice Admiral Jules James (1885–1957)  Commander, U.S. Naval Forces, Mediterranean at the close of WW II, decorated by the last King of Italy, Umberto II during his 34-day reign.
Rear Admiral Katō Hiroharu (Grand Officer in 1920), Imperial Japanese Navy
Major General Clayton P. Kerr (1900–1977), United States Army general, World War II member of the Allied Mission to the Italian Army
 Edward King, Viscount Kingsborough, in recognition of his work in researching and compiling his 'Antiquities of Mexico'.
Major General Robert A. McClure (1897–1957),  father of U.S. Army Special Operations, Director of Information and Media Control at Supreme Headquarters Allied Expeditionary Force (SHAEF) during World War II
Brigadier General Billy Mitchell (1879–1936),  United States Army air power advocate
Cesare Nava (1861–1933), Italian politician
Charles Poletti (1903–2002),  American lawyer and politician, Governor of New York, and colonel in the United States Army; served in Italy during World War II
John Rylands (1801–1888),  English entrepreneur and philanthropist
Alfred T. Smith (1874–1939), U.S. Army brigadier general
Alexander William Stewart (1868–1933), a naval architect, engineer and inventor
Rear Admiral Yates Stirling, Jr. (1872–1948),  United States Navy sea power advocate
Rear Admiral Ellery W. Stone (1894–1981),  United States Navy Radio pioneer
William Verbeck
Giacomo Vuxani (1886–1964),  Italian politician and patriot
Brigadier General George H. Weems, United States Army; World War II
Major General Arthur R. Wilson (1894–1956), United States Army; World War II, commanded Coastal Base Section in Naples

Non-order merit awards 
- Gold cross

- Silver cross

Grand Masters of the order 
Vittorio Emanuele, Prince of Naples, Duke of Savoy

Additional information 
According to International Commission for Orders of Chivalry the Order of Merit is also known as the Merit of Savoy

Under their section: chivalric institutions founded by the head of a formerly reigning dynasty, the Order has been defined as the following since their 2016 register:

ITALY

House of Savoy (Catholic)

Merit of Savoy

Founded: H.R.H. Crown Prince Vittorio Emanuele of Savoy, Prince of Piedmont and Prince of Naples 23 January 1988.

Ribbon: Blue with a broad white centre stripe.

Grand Master: H.R.H. Crown Prince Vittorio Emanuele of Savoy, Prince of Piedmont and Prince of Naples (Vittorio Emanuele IV, Titular King of Italy) (b. 1937).

Recipients (amongst others) 
As of the year 2000 there are/were 1453 recipients of the Order of Merit.

 Emanuele Filiberto of Savoy, Prince of Venice, Knight Grand Cross
 Clotilde Courau, Princess of Venice
 Princess Vittoria of Savoy, Princess of Carignano Marchioness of Ivrea
 Princess Luisa of Savoy
 Marina Doria, Princess of Naples and Duchess of Savoy
 Princess Maria Pia of Bourbon-Parma
 Princess Maria Gabriella of Savoy
 Princess Maria Beatrice of Savoy
 Prince Dimitri of Yugoslavia
 Prince Michael of Yugoslavia
 Prince Sergius of Yugoslavia
 Princess Helen of Yugoslavia
 Nicholas, Crown Prince of Montenegro
 Prince Carlo, Duke of Castro
 Mariano Hugo, Prince of Windisch-Graetz Knight Grand Cross
 Prince Don Alessandro Jacopo Boncompagni Ludovisi Altemps Knight Grand Cross
 Marquess Paolo Thaon di Revel Vandini Knight Grand Cross
 Baron Enrico Sanjust dei Baroni di Teulada Knight Grand Cross
 Prof. Alberto Bochicchio Knight Grand Cross
 Count Carlo Buffa dei Conti di Perrero  Knight Grand Cross
 Count Giuseppe Rizzani Knight Grand Cross
 Rudy Giuliani Knight Grand Cross
 Giovanni Cheli Knight Grand Cross
 Duke Giancarlo Melzi d'Eril  Knight Grand Cross
 Count Andrea Boezio Bertinotti Alliata
 Andrea Rivoira  Knight Grand Cross
 Antonio d’Amelio Knight Grand Cross
 Franca Sciaraffia Dame Grand Cross
 Nicolas Gagnebin Knight Grand Cross
 Theo Niederhauser Knight Grand Cross
 Monsignor Paolo de Nicolò Knight Grand Cross
 Alberto Di Maria
 Dame Zina Losapio
 Alessandro Santini
 Gino Lupini
 Marco Bocchio
 Alberico Guerzoni
 Alberto Coluccia
 Simone Balestrini
 Giovanni Cheli

See also 
List of Italian orders of knighthood
Dynastic Orders of Knighthood

References 

House of Savoy
Dynastic orders
Awards established in 1868
1983 disestablishments
Civil awards and decorations of Italy
1868 establishments in Italy
 
Victor Emmanuel II of Italy